Dagestan State Medical University is a higher educational institution in Makhachkala that trains specialists in the field of medicine and pharmaceuticals.

History 
A monument was erected in memory of doctors who died during the COVID-19 pandemic in Russia.

Alumni 

 Elmira Glubokovskaya, politician and public figure

References 

Dagestan State Medical University
Universities and institutes established in the Soviet Union
1932 establishments in Russia
Educational institutions established in 1932
Makhachkala
Organizations based in Dagestan
Medical schools in Russia
Universities in Russia